The Sunda stink badger (Mydaus javanensis), also called the Javan stink badger, teledu, Malay stink badger, Malay badger, Indonesian stink badger and Sunda skunk, is a mammal native to Indonesia and Malaysia. Despite the common name, stink badgers are not closely related to true badgers, and are, instead, Old World relatives of the skunks.

Description

Their fur is coarse, and black or very dark brown over most of the body, with a white stripe running from the top of the head to the tail. The width of the stripe varies considerably between individuals, but is usually narrow, and may be discontinuous. Females have six teats.

Distribution and habitat
Named for the Sunda Islands, Sunda stink badgers are found in Java, Sumatra, Borneo, and the northern Natuna Islands. Sunda stink badgers can be found across a wide variety of habitats, including forest edges or areas of secondary forest. This is now known not to be true, and more recent surveys have shown Sunda stink-badgers are often found in elevations well below 2000m.

Three subspecies are recognized:

 M. j. javanensis (Sunda stink badger) - Java and Sumatra
 M. j. lucifer (Bornean stink badger) - Borneo
 M. j. ollula (Natuna Islands stink badger) - northern Natuna Islands

Behaviour and ecology
The Sunda stink badger is omnivorous and highly nocturnal. The animal portion of its diet consists of invertebrates, eggs, and carrion. At night, it roots through soft soil using its snout and claws searching for worms and ground-dwelling insects. Females have been reported to give birth to litters of two or three young.

References

Stink badgers
Carnivorans of Malaysia
Mammals of Brunei
Mammals of Indonesia
Mammals of Borneo
Fauna of Sumatra
Mammals described in 1820
Aposematic species